Margrét Rannveig Ólafsdóttir (born 6 July 1976) is an Icelandic former professional footballer. She played 51 times for the Iceland women's national football team, scoring eight goals. Except for the 2001 season, in which she played for the Philadelphia Charge of the Women's United Soccer Association, Margrét spent her entire playing career with Breiðablik.

She was named Úrvalsdeild kvenna Player of the Year in 1994. She was the first female player to win 50 caps for Iceland.

References

External links

1976 births
Living people
Margret Rannveig Olafsdottir
Margret Rannveig Olafsdottir
Margret Rannveig Olafsdottir
Expatriate women's soccer players in the United States
Margret Rannveig Olafsdottir
Margret Rannveig Olafsdottir
Women's association football midfielders
Margret Rannveig Olafsdottir
Women's United Soccer Association players
Philadelphia Charge players